Banjani (earlier: Bandin Odžak, Бандин Оџак) is a village in the municipality of Sokolac, Bosnia and Herzegovina.

References

Populated places in Sokolac